The Florida Tech Panthers are the athletic teams that represent the Florida Institute of Technology, located in Melbourne, Florida, in intercollegiate athletics at the Division II level of National Collegiate Athletic Association (NCAA), competing in the Sunshine State Conference. Sports currently offered by the program include baseball, softball, women's volleyball, men's and women's basketball, men's and women's lacrosse, men's and women's soccer, men's and women's swimming.

Due to financial difficulties, the women's golf as well as both the men's and women's tennis programs were canceled in the spring of 2019. The men's football program was also canceled in the spring of 2020. Other sports formerly offered by the program include men's golf, men's and women's cross country, men's and women's rowing, and men's and women's track field (both indoor and outdoor).

Varsity sports

Baseball
Florida Tech has had 9 Major League Baseball Draft selections since the draft began in 1965.

Basketball

Florida Tech's basketball teams competes in the Sunshine State Conference. They compete in a very competitive NCAA DII Conference with schools like Florida Southern that have won National Championships. Due to this Florida Tech occasionally plays higher caliber Florida D1 Schools such as Florida State, Florida Gulf Coast, and Florida Atlantic University. In 2011–12 the Men's team would win the SSC Regular Season Championship with a record of 21–5 (12–4 SSC) and reach the NCAA Men's Division II Basketball Tournament, where they would advance to the second round of the South Regional . That year they would play two DI schools University of Alabama at Birmingham and University of Central Florida, losing to both.

The Panther women's team has been playing since the 1986–87 season and have been coached by John Reynolds since 1987–88. The Panther women have reached the NCAA Division II women's basketball tournament nine times, won six regular season Sunshine State Conference Championships, four SSC Tournament Championships, one NCAA Division II South Region title and appeared in the NCAA Division II Elite Eight in 2002. Entering the 2018–19 season, Reynolds' 559 wins ranks him at No. 8 among active D-II women's coaches and 20th all- time.

Football

The Florida Tech Football program was the intercollegiate American football team for Florida Institute of Technology located in the U.S. state of Florida. The team competed in the NCAA Division II and were members of the Gulf South Conference. Florida Tech's first football team was fielded in 2013. They played at the Florida Tech Panther Stadium.

National championships

Team

References

External links